Ceromitia pilularis is a species of moth of the  family Adelidae. It is known from Zimbabwe.

References

Adelidae
Endemic fauna of Zimbabwe
Lepidoptera of Zimbabwe
Moths of Sub-Saharan Africa
Moths described in 1921